Episode II is the first mainstream studio album by Safri Duo, a percussion duo from Denmark that released six classical albums before its breakthrough with the Michael Parsberg-produced hit "Played-A-Live", the opening track of the album. It was released on May 28, 2001, and reissued in 2002 with two additional tracks, including a cover version of "Sweet Freedom" with vocals by American R&B/soul singer Michael McDonald. Later the same year a Remix Edition of the album was released, which included an additional disc with remixes by artists such as Airscape, Cosmic Gate and Future Breeze.

Track listing

First edition

New Edition

The Remix Edition

Charts and certifications

Weekly charts

Year-end charts

Certifications

References

2001 debut albums
Safri Duo albums
Universal Music Group albums